The Alabama–Auburn men's basketball rivalry is a men's college basketball rivalry between the Auburn Tigers and the Alabama Crimson Tide. Though both schools are best known for their prestigious football programs, the deeply rooted rivalry between the two extends to basketball as well.

Foy-ODK Sportsmanship Award
The trophy given to the winner of the Alabama–Auburn football game is the Foy-ODK Sportsmanship Award. It is named after James E. Foy, an Alabama graduate and former Auburn dean of students and Omicron Delta Kappa Honor Society (ODK) – which was established on both campuses during the 1920s. The trophy is presented by the ODK president from the losing school to the winning school at midcourt during halftime of the Alabama–Auburn men's basketball game at the winning school's home arena.

Notable games
March 1, 1924 - Alabama defeats Auburn at the Southern Conference Tournament in Atlanta 40–19 in their first ever meeting.

January 5, 1955 - In the first ever matchup in which either team was ranked, #16 Alabama defeats #20 Auburn 99–78.

February 27, 1960 - #13 Auburn clinches its first ever SEC championship with a dramatic 63–61 victory over Alabama by a last second lay up in overtime.

February 14, 1970 - Auburn's John Mengelt scores a school-record 60 points and hits 23-of-44 field goals in the Tigers' 121–78 blow-out over Alabama. 
 
January 22, 1972 - After Auburn won 26 of 30 games in the series Alabama stopped the streak with 89–66 win.

March 8, 1975 - Auburn upsets #7 Alabama 76–70, snapping the Tide's 7 game win streak in the series.

January 3, 1977 - #3 Alabama survives on the road with a 74–71 victory over #20 Auburn.

January 5, 1983 - Led by Charles Barkley, Auburn upsets #5 Alabama 91–80.

March 9, 1985 - Auburn becomes the first team in SEC history to win four tournament games in four days as Auburn defeats Alabama in the SEC Tournament Championship Game 53–49 in overtime.

January 18, 1998 - Auburn hands Alabama their worst loss in school history with a 94–40 thrashing at Beard-Eaves-Memorial Coliseum.

February 21, 2001 - With 4.4 seconds left in overtime, Reggie Sharp weaves through traffic and banks in a 36-foot jumper to give Auburn a 72–69 upset of #15 Alabama.

January 18, 2003 - Auburn upsets #9 Alabama 77–68, extending Auburn's home court winning streak to 7, a school series record.

March 9, 2018 - After trailing by 10 points at halftime of the quarterfinals of the SEC Tournament, #9 seed Alabama outscored #1 seed Auburn 50–22 in the second half to win 81–63. It was the first time a 9 seed had defeated a 1 seed in the SEC Tournament.

January 15, 2020 - Alabama handed #4 Auburn its first loss of the season 83–64. This was the first time Alabama had beaten a top 4 team since 2004.

February 11, 2023 - #3 Alabama would win for the second time in three years at Neville Arena as they beat Auburn 77–69. This game was featured as the College GameDay game of the week, a first for the rivalry and for Alabama basketball.

Game results
Since 1924, the Crimson Tide and the Tigers have played 168 times. Alabama leads the all-time series, with 101 wins to Auburn's 67. The game has been played in 10 cities: Auburn, Tuscaloosa, Birmingham, Montgomery, Atlanta, Louisville, Memphis, Nashville, Orlando, and St. Louis. Alabama leads the series in Tuscaloosa (50–11), Atlanta (2–1), Louisville (2–0), Memphis (1–0), Nashville (1–0), Orlando (1–0), and St. Louis (1-0). Auburn leads the series in Auburn (34–28), Montgomery (17–9) and Birmingham (4–3). In games played at neutral sites, the Tigers lead (22–20); in games played during the SEC Tournament, the Crimson Tide lead (8–2); and in games played during the SEC Tournament Championship, the Tigers lead (1–0). In games in which only Auburn was ranked, the Tigers have a 13–4 record; in games in which only Alabama was ranked, the Tide have a 26–8 record. In games in which both teams were ranked, Alabama leads 4–1. A total of 12 games have gone past regulation, with the Tigers leading at 8–5.

All scores, dates, and rankings come from the Auburn University athletic website.

References

College basketball rivalries in the United States
Alabama Crimson Tide men's basketball
Auburn Tigers men's basketball